Gavrilovo is a rural locality in Vyborgsky District of Leningrad Oblast, Russia and a station of the Saint Petersburg-Vyborg railroad. It is located 108 kilometres northwest of Saint Petersburg and 22 kilometres from Vyborg.

History 
The village was born after 1881 when the railway station was opened. During the Finnish period, it was a part of the municipality of Kuolemajärvi, Viipuri Province. The original name was Kämärä. It was renamed Gavrilovo in 1948 as the village had become a part of the Soviet Union after World War II.

Gavrilovo was the site of the Battle of Kämärä, the first battle of the Finnish Civil War on 27 January 1918.

References 

Rural localities in Leningrad Oblast
Karelian Isthmus
Populated places established in 1881